Ludovico Costa (active 1648–1657) was an Italian painter, active mainly in his native Soncino and nearby towns. He may have trained in Cremona.

Biography
He painted  for the church of Santa Maria Assunta and San Giacomo of Soncino, for the parish church of Fontanella, as well as in some private homes.  His Virgin and Two Saints is found in San Domenico, Orzinuovi.

References

Year of birth unknown
Year of death unknown
Painters from Lombardy
17th-century Italian painters
Italian male painters
People from Soncino
Artists from the Province of Cremona